The 1983 Humboldt State Lumberjacks football team represented Humboldt State University during the 1983 NCAA Division II football season. Humboldt State competed in the Northern California Athletic Conference in 1983. This was a new name for the conference, as it had been called the Far Western Conference (FWC) since it was started in 1925.

The 1983 Lumberjacks were led by head coach Bud Van Deren in his 18th season. They played home games at the Redwood Bowl in Arcata, California. Humboldt State finished with a record of four wins and six losses (4–6, 3–3 NCAC). The Lumberjacks were outscored by their opponents 157–203 for the season.

Schedule

Notes

References

Humboldt State
Humboldt State Lumberjacks football seasons
Humboldt State Lumberjacks football